Steve Reed (born 6 January 1956) is a former footballer who played for Doncaster Rovers mainly as a full back and went on to coach Doncaster Belles.

Playing career
Reed initially played for the Doncaster Rovers Juniors side and then became an apprentice. During this time, as a 17-year-old, he was selected for training at Lilleshall with the England Youth Team.

His debut for the first team came in English Division 4 on 26 August 1972 in a 3–1 defeat at Cambridge United when he came on as substitute. The first of his two League goals didn't come until 21 March 1975 in a 3–2 home victory over Swansea City.

His last game for Rovers was in December 1978. After making a total of 161 League, FA Cup and League Cup appearances, and scoring 4 goals, Reed went to play for Gainsborough Trinity.

Coaching
Reed coached FA Women's Premier League club Doncaster Belles during the 2000–01 season when they finished as runners-up.

Honours
Doncaster Rovers
Sheffield and Hallamshire County Cup winner 1975–76

References

1956 births
Living people
Footballers from Doncaster
English footballers
English Football League players
Association football fullbacks
Doncaster Rovers F.C. players
Gainsborough Trinity F.C. players